is a song by Mao Abe. It was released as the main promotional track from her debut album, Free, in January 2009. Free is an upbeat pop rock song. In the lyrics, the protagonist expresses her feelings about how free she feels, and how she 'isn't the good girl she was yesterday.'

Release, promotion

The song had three tie-ups: it was used as the music countdown show CDTV January 2009 opening theme song (though it did not chart in the CDTV top 100), the music show Mashup! Musico's January ending theme song and the Glico Pocky commercial for special air on music video channel Space Shower.

The song was released to radio stations in late 2008. However, the song gained its most popularity in late January. Then, it reached #1 on the combined physical sales/airplay-based Billboard chart Japan Hot 100.

Music video

The music video was shot by director Masaki Ohkita, and shot in one day on November 22, 2008. The video begins showing Abe drawing spirals and patterns in the air with her finger (such as stars, or the song's name), before dawn at the Port of Kobe. Later, Abe performs the song with her band against the Kobe skyline. These two scenes are interspersed with shots of Abe singing the song in front of a wall of Marshall amplifiers.

As of April 20, 2010 the music video for Free has been viewed over 1,010,000 times on popular video-sharing website YouTube.

Personnel

Mao Abe - acoustic guitar, songwriter
Teppei Kawasaki - bass
N.O.B.U!!! - background vocals
Noriyuki Kisou - recording, mixing
Yūichi Komori - arranger
Tsuyoshi Miyagawa - drums
Junko Sugawara - electric guitar

Chart rankings

References

Mao Abe songs
2008 singles
Billboard Japan Hot 100 number-one singles
Japanese-language songs
2008 songs
Pony Canyon singles